The National Indigenous Music Awards 2022 were the 19th annual National Indigenous Music Awards (NIMAs). The awards were announced on 12 May, nominations were revealed on 13 July and the winners presented on 6 August 2022.

NIMAs creative director Ben Graetz said he was proud of the night’s proceedings. "To be at the Amphitheater with community, celebrating together in person will be something I will remember for a very long time."

Performers
 Thelma Plum
 King Stingray
 Emma Donovan & the Putbacks and Fred Leone - "We Won't Cry"
 Birdz & Fred Leone
 Yirrmal
 Manuel Dhurrkay
 Bumpy
 J-MILLA and the Red Flag Dancers. 

reference:

Hall of Fame inductee
 Gurrumul

Triple J Unearthed National Indigenous Winner
 Bumpy

Archie Roach Foundation Award
 Dobby

Awards
The nominations was revealed on 13 July 2022. Winners indicated in boldface, with other nominees in plain.

Artist of the Year

New Talent of the Year

Album of the Year

Film Clip of the Year

Song of the Year

Community Clip of the Year

References

2022 in Australian music
2022 music awards
National Indigenous Music Awards